The 1809 Massachusetts gubernatorial election was held on April 3, 1809.

Incumbent Democratic-Republican Governor Levi Lincoln Sr. had succeeded to the Governorship on the death of Governor James Sullivan on December 10, 1808. Lincoln was defeated for election to a term in his own right by Federalist nominee Christopher Gore.

General election

Candidates
Levi Lincoln Sr., Democratic-Republican, acting Governor, former Attorney General of the United States
Christopher Gore, Federalist, member of the Massachusetts House of Representatives, Federalist nominee for Governor in 1808

Results

References

1809
Massachusetts
Gubernatorial